Kokkola-Pietarsaari Airport is located in Kronoby, Finland, about  south of Kokkola city centre and  north-east of Jakobstad city centre.

Overview

The airport opened to traffic in 1960, when Aero began operating a route between Helsinki and Kokkola-Pietarsaari, then Kruunupyy Airport. In 1964 the first airport and air traffic control building are completed.

Until March 1, 2010, the name of the airport was Kruunupyy Airport or Kronoby Airport.

In 2010, about 80,000 passengers traveled via the airport. Scheduled serviced to Helsinki Airport is flown by Nordic Regional Airlines (Norra), operated as a code-share with Finnair. Finnair ended its own flights to Kokkola-Pietarsaari on 29 October 2010. Flights to Stockholm-Arlanda Airport by Nextjet began on 8 February 2014, with some flights being operated via Pori Airport. During winters, the airport is also used by charter flight airliners with a destination to southern Europe. The airport has two runways.

In 2012 the main runway was paved and the airport's lighting system was replaced.

Airlines and destinations
The following airlines operate regular scheduled and charter flights at Kokkola-Pietarsaari Airport:

Statistics

Ground transportation

See also 
List of the largest airports in the Nordic countries

References

External links
 Finavia – Kokkola-Pietarsaari Airport
 AIP Finland – Kokkola-Pietarsaari Airport
 
 
 

Airports in Finland
Airport
Airport
Buildings and structures in Ostrobothnia (region)
International airports in Finland